Survive, Kaleidoscope is the first live album by American rock band Underoath. It is released as a CD/DVD box set and was released on May 27, 2008. The DVD contains a full live set performed in Philadelphia, Pennsylvania.  It is also available for digital download on iTunes.

Track listing
Cities in which the tracks were recorded are listed in parenthesis.

DVD: "Live from The Electric Factory, Philadelphia, PA"
Lighting and set design: Jeff Verne. Sound recording: Andy Vickery.
 "Intro (Sālmarnir)"
 "Returning Empty Handed"
 "In Regards to Myself"
 "It's Dangerous Business Walking Out Your Front Door"
 "You're Ever So Inviting"
 "To Whom It May Concern"
 "A Moment Suspended in Time"
 "Young and Aspiring" (misnamed "Returning Empty Handed")
 "There Could Be Nothing After This"
 "Writing on the Walls"
 "Everyone Looks So Good from Here"
 "Casting Such a Thin Shadow"
 "Moving for the Sake of Motion"
 "A Boy Brushed Red...Living in Black and White"

References

Underoath albums
2008 live albums
2008 video albums
Live video albums
Tooth & Nail Records live albums
Tooth & Nail Records video albums